The Journal of Marital and Family Therapy is a quarterly peer-reviewed academic journal published by Wiley-Blackwell on behalf of the American Association for Marriage and Family Therapy.  The journal was established in 1975. The current editor-in-chief is Steve Harris (University of Minnesota). The journal covers research, theory, clinical practice, and training in marital therapy and family therapy.

According to the Journal Citation Reports, the journal has a 2020 impact factor of 2.379, ranking it 21 out of 47 journals in the category "Family Studies".

References

External links 
 

Wiley-Blackwell academic journals
English-language journals
Publications established in 1975
Quarterly journals
Psychotherapy journals
Family therapy journals